The National Equality Standard (NES) is an initiative created by Ernst & Young in 2013. It was developed "for business, by business" and sets clear Equality, Diversity and Inclusion (EDI) criteria against which companies are assessed. Their EDI policies and practices are reviewed, areas for improvement are identified, and recommendations for improvement are provided.

Background 
The NES has been developed and sponsored by Ernst & Young, supported by the Equality & Human Rights Commission (EHRC), the Home Office and the Confederation of British Industry and developed in partnership with the following UK and global companies:

BHP
Bright Ideas Trust
BT Group
Cisco
EDF Energy
Green Park
Lawn Tennis Association
Linklaters
Microsoft UK
National Grid
Nestlé
Pearn Kandola
Pearson
Roast
Royal Bank of Scotland
Vodafone
WPP

The NES was launched in May 2013 at the British Museum. Since then many businesses have signed up and the Standard has received significant media attention and news coverage.

People 
Arun Batra is the CEO and founder of the NES. Prior to his position at Ernst & Young, he ran the Mayor's "Diversity Works" programme in London. He has recently been recognised as one of Britain's most influential Asians for leading the establishment of the NES.

Batra is supported by Harry Gaskell, the managing partner of Ernst & Young's UK and Ireland advisory Practice and Head of D&I, and the Chair of the Employers Network for Equality & Inclusion (ENEI).Sir David Bell has been appointed as the Non-executive Chair of the steering committee that drives the development of the NES.

The National Equality Standard Assessment 
Through the NES, companies are subjected to an EDI assessment which has been devised by the NES Board and EY. The NES Assessment provides companies with a comprehensive quality review of their EDI policies and practices, identifies areas for improvement and provides implementation recommendations. Each company that undertakes the NES undergoes assessment against a predefined set of criteria across seven standards. Trained NES Assessors review documentation, ensure legal compliance, conduct comprehensive interviews and sample staff through in-depth surveys. The outcome is detailed in a comprehensive report.

The Objectives 
The objectives of the NES are to provide an assessment tool which:
Aims to significantly impact the way diversity and inclusion is integrated into everyday business activity across the country
Provides a single reference point incorporating all elements of the Equality Act 2010
Enables businesses to undertake a comprehensive assessment specifically focused on EDI
Consists of best practice standards that can be applied to any business sector or size
Provides a pragmatic solution to EDI that rewards ambition
Supports the private sector by providing one recognizable holistic framework for industry good practice
Enables companies to showcase their businesses as leaders in this field
Bridges the gap between legal requirements and best practice

Feedback 
The feedback from those undertaking assessments has been positive; Tina Southall, Director, Diversity and Inclusion at Vodafone Group Services described the assessment process in an interview:
“The assessment process was excellent. It really captured both the macro status but also important details. It consisted of an in-depth review of materials and a very professional and well structured audit. It provided thought provoking insights combined with pragmatic and actionable recommendations. The Standard has potential to drive a real change in Equality Standards.”

References

Equality rights
Ernst & Young
2013 establishments in England